The 2009–10 Barangay Ginebra Kings season is the 31st season of the franchise in the Philippine Basketball Association (PBA).

Key dates
August 2: The 2009 PBA Draft took place in Fort Bonifacio, Taguig.

Draft picks

Roster

Philippine Cup

Eliminations

Standings

Game log

Eliminations

|- bgcolor="#bbffbb" 
| 1
| October 14
| San Miguel
| 93–86
| Menk (18)
| Menk, Tubid (9)
| Helterbrand (9)
| Araneta Coliseum
| 1–0
|- bgcolor="#bbffbb" 
| 2
| October 18
| Purefoods
| 95–87
| Helterbrand (19)
| Wilson (7)
| Helterbrand (9)
| Araneta Coliseum
| 2–0
|- bgcolor="#bbffbb" 
| 3
| October 23
| Smart Gilas*
| 100–72
| Tubid (22)
| Villanueva (11)
| Wilson (6)
| Cuneta Astrodome
| 
|- bgcolor="#edbebf" 
| 4
| October 25
| Alaska
| 96–105
| Helterbrand (23)
| Alvarez (10)
| Helterbrand (7)
| Araneta Coliseum
| 2–1

|- bgcolor="#bbffbb" 
| 5
| November 6
| Barako Bull
| 94–86
| Baguio (22)
| Wilson (9)
| Cruz (7)
| Cuneta Astrodome
| 3–1
|- bgcolor="#bbffbb" 
| 6
| November 8
| Rain or Shine
| 86–87
| Baguio (17)
| Wilson (9)
| Baguio (6)
| Araneta Coliseum
| 4–1
|- bgcolor="#bbffbb" 
| 7
| November 14
| Burger King
| 83–79
| Villanueva (16)
| Wilson (8)
| Villanueva, 2 others (3)
| Tubod, Lanao del Norte
| 5–1
|- bgcolor="#edbebf" 
| 8
| November 18
| Sta. Lucia
| 72–93
| Menk (14)
| Menk, Intal (6)
| Helterbrand (5)
| Araneta Coliseum
| 5–2
|- bgcolor="#edbebf" 
| 9
| November 25
| Talk 'N Text
| 72–87
| Tubid (21)
| Menk (10)
| Menk (4)
| Araneta Coliseum
| 5–3
|- bgcolor="#bbffbb" 
| 10
| November 27
| Coca Cola
| 113–104
| Tubid (33)
| Alvarez(9)
| Abarrientos (6)
| Ynares Center
| 6–3

|- bgcolor="#bbffbb" 
| 11
| December 4
| Barako Bull
| 88–76
| Tubid (30)
| Menk (10)
| Abarrientos (6)
| Araneta Coliseum
| 7–3
|- bgcolor="#edbebf" 
| 12
| December 6
| Purefoods
| 81–89
| Baguio (19)
| Mamaril (6)
| Menk (4)
| Araneta Coliseum
| 7–4
|- bgcolor="#bbffbb" 
| 13
| December 12
| Rain or Shine
| 101–97
| Menk (21)
| Tubid (10)
| Baguio (6)
| Tacloban City
| 8–4
|- bgcolor="#edbebf" 
| 14
| December 16
| Sta. Lucia
| 88–93
| Tubid (21)
| Villanueva (13)
| Tubid, Abarrientos (4)
| Araneta Coliseum
| 8–5
|- bgcolor="#edbebf" 
| 15
| December 20
| San Miguel
| 86–91 (OT)
| Tubid (21)
| Intal (10)
| Baguio (4)
| Araneta Coliseum
| 8–6
|- bgcolor="#bbffbb" 
| 16
| December 25
| Coca Cola
| 106–97
| Intal (20)
| Wilson (11)
| Wilson, Baguio (4)
| Cuneta Astrodome
| 9–6

|- bgcolor="#bbffbb" 
| 17
| January 6
| Talk 'N Text
| 105–82
| Intal (19)
| Intal (8)
| Cruz (7)
| Araneta Coliseum
| 10–6
|- bgcolor="#bbffbb" 
| 18
| January 9
| Alaska
| 93–90
| Baguio (20)
| Intal (11)
| Baguio (5)
| Batangas City
| 11–6
|- bgcolor="#bbffbb" 
| 19
| January 17
| Burger King
| 122–104
| Intal, Baguio (24)
| Tubid, 2 others (8)
| Intal (5)
| Araneta Coliseum
| 12–6

Playoffs

|-  bgcolor="#edbebf" 
| 1
| January 29
| Talk 'N Text
| 92–107
| Intal (19)
| Villanueva (12)
| Cruz (4)
| Araneta Coliseum
| 0–1
|-  bgcolor="#edbebf" 
| 2
| January 31
| Talk 'N Text
| 105–106
| Intal (23)
| Villanueva (14)
| Cruz (4)
| Araneta Coliseum
| 0–2
|-  bgcolor="#bbffbb" 
| 3
| February 3
| Talk 'N Text
| 102–97
| Intal (25)
| Intal, Wilson (10)
| Villanueva (4)
| Araneta Coliseum
| 1–2
|-  bgcolor="#bbffbb" 
| 4
| February 5
| Talk 'N Text
| 27–20 (by forfeit)
| n/a
| n/a
| n/a
| Araneta Coliseum
| 2–2
|-  bgcolor="#bbffbb" 
| 5
| February 7
| Talk 'N Text
| 113–100
| Intal (28)
| Menk (14)
| Intal, 2 others (4)
| Araneta Coliseum
| 3–2

|-  bgcolor="#edbebf" 
| 1
| February 10
| Alaska
| 79–104
| Caguioa (23)
| Salvacion, Intal (7)
| Helterbrand (4)
| Araneta Coliseum
| 0–1
|-  bgcolor="#edbebf" 
| 2
| February 12
| Alaska
| 82–90
| Villanueva (17)
| Villanueva (11)
| Helterbrand (8)
| Cuneta Astrodome
| 0–2
|-  bgcolor="#edbebf" 
| 3
| February 14
| Alaska
| 88–91
| Caguioa (20)
| Caguioa, 2 others (9)
| Caguioa, 2 others (3)
| Araneta Coliseum
| 0–3
|-  bgcolor="#edbebf" 
| 4
| February 17
| Alaska
| 95–102
| Helterbrand (20)
| Villanueva (6)
| Helterbrand (6)
| Araneta Coliseum
| 0–4

|-  bgcolor="#edbebf" 
| 1
| February 10
| San Miguel
| 88–95
| 
| 
| 
| Araneta Coliseum
|

Fiesta Conference

Eliminations

Standings

Game log

Transactions

Pre-season

Philippine Cup

Free agents

Additions

Mid-season break

Trades

Free agents

Additions

Subtractions

Fiesta Conference

Trades

Imports recruited

References

Barangay Ginebra San Miguel seasons
Barangay